Newton Theological Institution was a Baptist theological seminary founded on November 28, 1825 in Newton Centre, Massachusetts.

Newton adopted the graduate education model and three-year curriculum pioneered by Andover Theological Seminary, with which it shared a theological tradition of evangelistic zeal. Students from the two institutions were at the forefront of the modern missionary movement.

Merger 

Newton shared its campus with Andover from 1931 to 1965, when the schools formally merged to form Andover Newton Theological School. By virtue of Andover's prior affiliation with Harvard University, students of Andover Newton are allowed to take classes in any of Harvard's ten graduate schools.

In 2016 Andover Newton Theological School announced that it would be leaving the Newton Centre campus in June 2017 and that most courses would thereafter be taught at Yale Divinity School.

References

External links 
 Newton Theological Institution: A Sketch of Its History, and an Account of the Services at the Dedication of the New Building, September 10, 1866. (Boston: Gould & Lincoln, 1866).
 Hovey, Alvah. Historical Address Delivered at the Fiftieth Anniversary of the Newton Theological Institution, June 8, 1875. (Boston: Wright and Potter, 1875).
 Historical Addresses Delivered at the Newton Centennial, June 1925. (Newton Centre, MA: The Institution Bulletin, 1925).

Educational institutions established in 1825
Seminaries and theological colleges in Massachusetts
Defunct private universities and colleges in Massachusetts
Former theological colleges in the United States